Swatch is Swatch Group's namesake brand of watches.

Swatch may also refer to:
The Swatch Group, a Swiss company and watch manufacturer
Swatch Internet Time, an alternate means of telling time that uses decimals instead of hours and minutes
A textile sample
In computer graphics, the term has come to mean a palette of active colors.
In painting, the word means a sample of color designed to show the actual dried result of applying certain paint(s).
Swatch (knitting)
Swatch Mercedes ART
Swatch Open
Swatch (Log monitoring), an Open source software project under SourceForge delivering a program for monitoring Unix/Linux log files
Swatch, a character in the video game Deltarune